Matt Holland (born 1974) is a former footballer.

Matthew Holland may also refer to:

 Matthew Holland (water polo) (born 1989), water polo player
 Matthew S. Holland (born 1966), President of Utah Valley University
 Matthew Holland (cricketer) (born 1971), former English cricketer